Bham Bolenath is a Telugu stoner-comedy film directed by Karthik Varma Dandu and produced by Siruvuri Rajesh Varma under R.C.C Entertainments. It stars Navdeep, Pooja Jhaveri, Naveen Chandra,  Pradeep Machiraju, Posani Krishna Murali, Kireeti Damaraju, and Prudhvi Raj. The film was released on 27 February 2015. lt received mixed reviews from critics.

Cast
 Navdeep as Vishnu
 Pooja Jhaveri as Sri Lakshmi
 Naveen Chandra as Krishna
 Pradeep Machiraju as Rocky
 Posani Krishna Murali as Sethji
 Kireeti Damaraju as Roshan
 Thagubothu Ramesh
 Praveen as Krishna's friend
 Fish Venkat
 Pankaj Kesari as Vasool Raja
 Naveen Neni
 Prudhvi Raj as police officer
 Rajitha

Soundtrack
The music was composed by Sai Karthik and released by Tanmayi Music.

References

External links 

2015 films
2010s Telugu-language films
Films scored by Sai Karthik